Christian Business Men's Connection (CBMC) is an international evangelical Christian mission organization to reach out to businessmen. CBMC began in Chicago in 1930, joined with other similar groups to create a national organization in 1937, and moved its headquarters to Chattanooga, Tennessee in 1978. Among its prominent early leaders was the industrialist R. G. LeTourneau.  Timothy N. Philpot was President of CBMC International from July 1996 to September 2003.

According to the organization there are now 18,000 members in 700 teams in the US, and international branches in over 70 countries with over 50,000 members.

References

External links
Official website

Evangelical organizations established in the 20th century
Evangelicalism in Tennessee
1930 establishments in the United States
Men's religious organizations
Men's organizations in the United States